Kansas City Outbound is an album by jazz pianist Roberto Magris released on the JMood label in 2008, featuring performances by the Roberto Magris Trio with Art Davis, Jimmy “Junebug” Jackson and Zack Albetta. This album is also the final recording of bassist Art Davis.

Reception

The Jazzreview review by Paul J. Youngman awarded the album 4 stars, observing that it "starts out dark and deep with a hard bop sensibility (and) progresses through the blues", and particularly lauding Magris's keyboard skills. The All About Jazz review by Dan McClenaghan awarded the album 4 stars, and ranked the album "on the top shelf, gleaming with the best of them."

Track listing
 Kansas City Outbound (Roberto Magris) - 3:24 
 I Fall in Love Too Easily (Cahn/Styne) - 8:38 
 Iraqi Blues (Roberto Magris) - 7:09 
 A Flower is a Lovesome Thing (Billy Strayhorn) - 4:22 
 KC Inbound (Roberto Magris) - 3:25 
 Reverend du Bop (Andrew Hill) - 7:38 
 Rainbow Eyes (Roberto Magris) - 3:21 
 Bemsha Swing (Thelonious Monk) - 5:21 
 Lonely Woman (Benny Carter) - 4:02 
 Darn That Dream (Burke/Van Heusen) - 6:43 
 Alone Together (Dietz/Schwartz) - 6:30 
 Bye Bye Baby (Cahn/Styne) - 5:06

Personnel

Musicians
Roberto Magris - piano
Art Davis - bass
Jimmy “Junebug” Jackson - drums (on 1, 2, 3, 8)
Zack Albetta - drums (on 5, 6, 7, 10, 11, 12)

Production
 Paul Collins – producer
 Justin Mantooth – engineering
 Jerry Lockett – photography

References

2008 albums
Roberto Magris albums